Jessica Josephine Wendel (born August 22, 1990), also known as simply Josephine, is a Greek pop singer. She is known for her participation in the Greek national final for the Eurovision Song Contest 2014 with the song "Dancing Night". Wendel has also competed in the Greek edition of the Your Face Sounds Familiar. On 26 December 2020, she won the fourth Greek season of  Just the 2 of Us, along with actor and entrepreneur Nasos Papargyropoulos.

Early life
Josephine was born on August 22, 1990, in Athens to Margarita Venti and Alex Wendel. Her mother is Greek with Lebanese roots and her father is of German descent. She has two younger half-siblings from her parents' next marriages. She went to American Community Schools of Athens. At the age of 18, she began Marketing–Management studies at Deree College and at the same time she was uploading cover songs on Facebook.

Career

2013–2014: The beginning and Eurovision
While still a student, Josephine met the manager and executive of Panik Records, George Arsenakos, in an event. Arsenakos already knew about Josephine by her covers she used to upload on Facebook and he asked her to cooperate. In March 2013, Wendel released her first song "Gia mia akoma fora" (For One More Time) in lyrics and music by herself and the rapper OGE. The song had a great success on YouTube with more than 8 million views. At the same year, three more songs got released; "Piso an gyriza to chrono" (If I turned back time) with Unique, "Radio" with Lunatic & RiskyKidd, and "Ola allazoun" (Everything changes) with Snik.

In 2014, she was nominated for the Eurovision Song Contest 2014 with the song "Dancing Night" in lyrics & music by DJ Mark Angelo but eventually came 4th place (last) in the Eurosong 2014 – a MAD show, Greek national final. In July of the same year, she released the song "Dromos agapis" (Love Road) in collaboration with Dj Kas and OGE, and in November she collaborated with DJ Pitsi for the song "Turn Off The Lights".

2015–present: Your Face Sounds Familiar and new releases
In 2015, she starts appearing in the Apotheke nightclub with the famous Greek singer Katy Garbi, while she released two songs; "Prosehos" (Coming soon) and "Esy ki ego" (You and I). Wendel represented Greece with the song "Moonlight" in the New Wave Festival 2015, which was held in Sochi, Russia.

Subsequently, in 2016, she participated as a contestant at the third season of the Your Face Sounds Familiar, while she appeared in the MadWalk – The Fashion Music Project with OtherView and Maria Korinthiou, performing the song "All About That Bass" by Meghan Trainor. She also appeared in the MadWalk Cyprus where she performed "Love, Sex, Magic" with Konstantinos Frantzis. However, she released two more songs; "Kalokairines stigmes" (Summer Moments) with REC, and "San paramythi" (Like a Fairytale) with The Gatsbies.

In 2017, Josephine began live appearances at BOX Athens nightclub with OtherView and Melisses. In March, she released her song with title "Cocktail". Shortly afterwards, she appeared on MadWalk – The Fashion Music Project, this time with Konnie Metaxa, where they performed their new song "Sha La La (Amaxi)". In November of the same year, the song "Dyo stagones nero" (Two Drops of Water) is released in lyrics by OtherView, with whom she also appeared at the Fantasia Live Nightclub in the winter season 2017–18.

In February 2018, she started her own sports leggings collection, in collaboration with the clothing company Type Of Love. In the summer, Wendel released her new song "Magia" (Spells) which got a great success. She made a live tour in Thessaloniki with Konnie Metaxa and Lefteris Pantazis. In October, she made a guest appearance in the Greek version of the fashion show, My Style Rocks. She also made live appearances in the Athinon Arenas nightclub with Nikos Oikonomopoulos, Anna Kamarinou, Anastasios Rammos and Stelios Legakis. She was starring in the music inspection "Kano Comeback" by Michalis Reppas & Thanasis Papathanassiou, along with Fotis Sergoulopoulos, Tzeni Diagoupi and Konstantinos Frantzis at the Shamone Club.

On 17 January 2019, Josephine released her song "Pes mou pos" (Tell Me How), with the rapper Bo. On March 9, she released her song, entitled "Ti" (What) and on October 24, she released her new song, "Den Exo Sima" in lyrics and music by Leonidas Sozos. In September 2019, Wendel made her first international tour "JSPN Tour" in Miami, Florida, Philadelphia and New York, New York.

In 2020, Wendel released three new songs, "Fimi" (Fame) featuring MadClip, "Ego" and "Portofoli". She won the fourth Greek season of  Just the 2 of Us, along with the actor and entrepreneur Nasos Papargyropoulos.

In 2021, she released "Paliopaido".

Discography

Albums
100% (2021)

Singles

As lead artist

As featured artist

References

1990 births
Living people
Singers from Athens
21st-century Greek women singers
Greek pop singers
Greek people of Lebanese descent
Greek people of German descent